Madame Bovary, originally published as Madame Bovary: Provincial Manners, is a novel by French writer Gustave Flaubert, published in 1856. The eponymous character lives beyond her means in order to escape the banalities and emptiness of provincial life.

When the novel was first serialized in Revue de Paris between 1 October 1856 and 15 December 1856, public prosecutors attacked the novel for obscenity. The resulting trial in January 1857 made the story notorious. After Flaubert's acquittal on 7 February 1857, Madame Bovary became a bestseller in April 1857 when it was published in two volumes. A seminal work of literary realism, the novel is now considered Flaubert's masterpiece, and one of the most influential literary works in history.

Plot synopsis

Madame Bovary takes place in provincial Northern France, near the town of Rouen in Normandy. Charles Bovary is a shy, oddly dressed teenager arriving at a new school where his new classmates ridicule him. He struggles his way to a second-rate medical degree, and becomes an Officier de santé in the Public Health Service. He marries the woman his mother has chosen for him, the unpleasant but supposedly rich widow Héloïse Dubuc. He sets out to build a practice in the village of Tôtes.

One day, Charles visits a local farm to set the owner's broken leg and meets his patient's daughter, Emma Rouault. Emma is a beautiful, poetically dressed young woman who has received a "good education" in a convent. She has a powerful yearning for luxury and romance inspired by reading popular novels. Charles is immediately attracted to her, and visits his patient far more often than necessary, until Héloïse's jealousy puts a stop to the visits.

When Héloïse unexpectedly dies, Charles waits a decent interval before courting Emma in earnest. Her father gives his consent, and Emma and Charles marry.

The novel's focus shifts to Emma. After Charles and Emma attend an elegant ball given by the Marquis d'Andervilliers, Emma finds her married life dull and becomes listless. Charles decides his wife needs a change of scenery and moves his practice to the larger market town of Yonville (traditionally identified with the town of Ry). There, Emma gives birth to a daughter, Berthe, but motherhood proves a disappointment to Emma. She becomes infatuated with Léon Dupuis, an intelligent young man she meets in Yonville. Léon is a law student who shares Emma's appreciation for literature and music and returns her esteem. Emma does not acknowledge her passion for Léon, who despairs of gaining Emma's affection and departs for Paris to continue his studies.

One day, a rich and rakish landowner, Rodolphe Boulanger, brings a servant to the doctor's office to be bled. He casts his eye over Emma and imagines she will be easily seduced. He invites her to go riding with him for the sake of her health. Charles, solicitous for his wife's health and not at all suspicious, embraces the plan. Emma and Rodolphe begin an affair. She, consumed by her romantic fantasy, risks compromising herself with indiscreet letters and visits to her lover. After four years, she insists they run away together. Rodolphe does not share her enthusiasm for this plan and on the eve of their planned departure, he ends the relationship with a letter placed at the bottom of a basket of apricots delivered to Emma. The shock is so great that Emma falls deathly ill and briefly returns to religion.

When Emma is nearly fully recovered, she and Charles attend the opera, at Charles' insistence, in nearby Rouen. The work being performed that evening was Gaetano Donizetti's Lucia di Lammermoor, based on Walter Scott's 1819 historical novel The Bride of Lammermoor. The opera reawakens Emma's passions, and she re-encounters Léon who, now educated and working in Rouen, is also attending the opera. They begin an affair. While Charles believes that she is taking piano lessons, Emma travels to the city each week to meet Léon, always in the same room of the same hotel, which the two come to view as their home. The love affair is ecstatic at first, but Léon grows bored with Emma's emotional excesses, and Emma grows ambivalent about Léon. Emma indulges her fancy for luxury goods and clothes with purchases made on credit from the merchant Lheureux, who arranges for her to obtain power of attorney over Charles' estate. All the same, Emma's debt steadily mounts.

When Lheureux calls in Bovary's debt, Emma pleads for money from several people, including Léon and Rodolphe, only to be turned down. In despair, she swallows arsenic, purloined from the shop of Homais the apothecary, and dies an agonizing death. Charles, heartbroken, abandons himself to grief, preserves Emma's room as a shrine, and adopts her attitudes and tastes to keep her memory alive. In his last months, he stops working and lives by selling off his possessions. His remaining possessions are seized to pay off Lheureux. When he finds Rodolphe and Léon's love letters, he breaks down for good. He dies, and his young daughter Berthe is placed with her grandmother, who soon dies. Berthe then lives with an impoverished aunt, who sends her to work in a cotton mill. The book concludes with the local pharmacist Homais, who had competed with Charles' medical practice, gaining prominence among Yonville people and being rewarded for his medical achievements.

Characters
Emma Bovary is the novel's eponymous protagonist (Charles's mother and his former wife are also referred to as Madame Bovary, while their daughter remains Mademoiselle Bovary). She has a highly romanticized view of the world and craves beauty, wealth, passion, as well as high society. It is the disparity between these romantic ideals and the realities of her country life that drive most of the novel, leading her into two affairs and to accrue a sizable debt that eventually leads to her suicide.  She lives a life of the mind, and it is her introspection and analysis of her internal conflicts that marks the psychological growth of Flaubert as an author.

Charles Bovary, Emma's husband, is a very simple and common man. He is a country doctor by profession but is, as in everything else, not very good at it. He is in fact not qualified enough to be termed a doctor, but is instead an officier de santé, or "health officer". Yet he is a healthy man who enjoys his work, riding about to attend to patients. He is outgoing and friendly, with a gift for remembering names and faces, and he is mostly called upon to perform first aid. He does this competently enough to earn the loyalty and friendship of his patients in Tôtes; however, when he moves to Yonville to practise medicine there he is sabotaged by the pharmacist Homais. Charles adores his wife and finds her faultless, despite obvious evidence to the contrary. He never suspects her affairs and gives her complete control over his finances, thereby securing his own ruin. Despite Charles's complete devotion to Emma, she despises him, for she finds him the epitome of all that is dull and common.

Rodolphe Boulanger is a wealthy local man who seduces Emma as one more in a long string of mistresses. Though occasionally charmed by Emma, Rodolphe feels little true emotion towards her. As Emma becomes more and more desperate, Rodolphe loses interest and worries about her lack of caution. After his decision to escape with Emma, he resigns and feels unable to handle it, especially the existence of her daughter, Berthe.

Léon Dupuis is a clerk who introduces Emma to poetry and who falls in love with her. He leaves Yonville when he despairs of Emma reciprocating his feelings, but the two reconnect after Emma's affair with Rodolphe Boulanger collapses. They begin an affair, which is Emma's second.

Monsieur Lheureux is a manipulative and sly merchant who continually convinces people in Yonville to buy goods on credit and borrow money from him. Having led many small businesspeople into financial ruin to support his business ambitions, Lheureux lends money to Charles and plays Emma masterfully, leading the Bovarys so far into debt as to cause their financial ruin and Emma's suicide.

Monsieur Homais is the town pharmacist. He is vehemently anti-clerical and practises medicine without a licence. He is pompous and prone to long-winded speeches on subjects he is ill-informed on. He is not above under-handed tactics or manipulation to achieve his goals.

Justin is Monsieur Homais' apprentice and second cousin.  He had been taken into the house on charity and was useful at the same time as a servant. He harbors a crush on Emma. At one point he steals the key to the medical supply room, and Emma tricks him into opening a container of arsenic so she can "kill some rats keeping her awake". She, however, consumes the arsenic herself, much to his horror and remorse.

Setting
The setting of the novel is important, first as it applies to Flaubert's realist style and social commentary, and, second, as it relates to the protagonist, Emma.

Francis Steegmuller estimated that the novel begins in October 1827 and ends in August 1846. This roughly corresponds with the July Monarchy, the reign of Louis Philippe I, who strolled through Paris carrying his own umbrella as if to honor an ascendant bourgeois middle class. Much of the time and effort that Flaubert spends detailing the customs of the rural French people shows them aping an urban, emergent middle class.

Flaubert strove for an accurate depiction of common life. The account of a county fair in Yonville displays this and dramatizes it by showing the fair in real time counterpoised with a simultaneous intimate interaction behind a window overlooking the fair. Flaubert knew the regional setting, the place of his birth and youth, in and around the city of Rouen in Normandy. His faithfulness to the mundane elements of country life has garnered the book its reputation as the beginning of the movement known as literary realism.

Flaubert's capture of the commonplace in his setting contrasts with the yearnings of his protagonist. The practicalities of common life foil Emma's romantic fantasies. Flaubert uses this juxtaposition to reflect both setting and character. Emma becomes more capricious and ludicrous in the light of everyday reality; yet her yearnings magnify the self-important banality of the local people. Emma, though impractical, and with her provincial education lacking and unformed, still reflects a hopefulness regarding beauty and greatness that seems absent in the bourgeois class.

Style
The book was in some ways inspired by the life of a schoolfriend of the author who became a doctor. Flaubert's friend and mentor, Louis Bouilhet, had suggested to him that this might be a suitably "down-to-earth" subject for a novel and that Flaubert should attempt to write in a "natural way," without digressions. The writing style was of supreme importance to Flaubert. While writing the novel, he wrote that it would be "a book about nothing, a book dependent on nothing external, which would be held together by the internal strength of its style", an aim which, for the critic Jean Rousset, made Flaubert "the first in date of the non-figurative novelists", such as James Joyce and Virginia Woolf. Though Flaubert avowed no liking for the style of Balzac, the novel he produced became arguably a prime example and an enhancement of literary realism in the vein of Balzac. The "realism" in the novel was to prove an important element in the trial for obscenity: the lead prosecutor argued that not only was the novel immoral, but that realism in literature was an offence against art and decency.

The realist movement was, in part, a reaction against romanticism. Emma may be said to be the embodiment of a romantic: in her mental and emotional process, she has no relation to the realities of her world. Although in some ways he may seem to identify with Emma, Flaubert frequently mocks her romantic daydreaming and taste in literature. The accuracy of Flaubert's supposed assertion that "Madame Bovary, c'est moi" ("Madame Bovary is me") has been questioned. In his letters, he distanced himself from the sentiments in the novel. To Edma Roger des Genettes, he wrote, "Tout ce que j'aime n'y est pas" ("all that I love is not there") and to Marie-Sophie Leroyer de Chantepie, "je n'y ai rien mis ni de mes sentiments ni de mon existence" ("I have used nothing of my feelings or of my life"). For Mario Vargas Llosa, "If Emma Bovary had not read all those novels, it is possible that her fate might have been different."

Madame Bovary has been seen as a commentary on the bourgeoisie, the folly of aspirations that can never be realized or a belief in the validity of a self-satisfied, deluded personal culture, associated with Flaubert's period, especially during the reign of Louis Philippe, when the middle class grew to become more identifiable in contrast to the working class and the nobility. Flaubert despised the bourgeoisie. In his Dictionary of Received Ideas, the bourgeoisie is characterized by intellectual and spiritual superficiality, raw ambition, shallow culture, a love of material things, greed, and above all a mindless parroting of sentiments and beliefs.

For Vargas Llosa, "Emma's drama is the gap between illusion and reality, the distance between desire and its fulfillment" and shows "the first signs of alienation that a century later will take hold of men and women in industrial societies."

Literary significance and reception
Long established as one of the greatest novels, the book has been described as a "perfect" work of fiction. Henry James wrote: "Madame Bovary has a perfection that not only stamps it, but that makes it stand almost alone: it holds itself with such a supreme unapproachable assurance as both excites and defies judgment." Marcel Proust praised the "grammatical purity" of Flaubert's style, while Vladimir Nabokov said that "stylistically it is prose doing what poetry is supposed to do". Similarly, in his preface to his novel The Joke, Milan Kundera wrote, "not until the work of Flaubert did prose lose the stigma of aesthetic inferiority. Ever since Madame Bovary, the art of the novel has been considered equal to the art of poetry." Giorgio de Chirico said that in his opinion "from the narrative point of view, the most perfect book is Madame Bovary by Flaubert". Julian Barnes called it the best novel that has ever been written.

The novel exemplifies the tendency of realism, over the course of the nineteenth century, to become increasingly psychological, concerned with the accurate representation of thoughts and emotions rather than of external things. As such it prefigures the work of the great modernist novelists Marcel Proust, Virginia Woolf and James Joyce.

The book was controversial upon its release: its scandalous subject matter led to an obscenity trial in 1856. Flaubert was acquitted.

Translations into English 
 George Saintsbury (partial translation, 1878)
 Eleanor Marx (1886)
 Henry Blanchamp (1905)
 J. Lewis May (1928)
 Gerard Hopkins (1948)
 Joan Charles (abridged, 1949)
 Alan Russell (1950)
 Francis Steegmuller (1957)
 Mildred Marmur (1964)
 Paul de Man (1965)
 Geoffrey Wall (1992)
 Margaret Mauldon (2004)
 Lydia Davis (2010)
Christopher Moncrieff (2010)
 Adam Thorpe (2011)

Adaptations

Film
Madame Bovary has had the following film and television adaptations:
 Unholy Love (1932), directed by Albert Ray
 Madame Bovary (1934), directed by Jean Renoir and starring Max Dearly and Valentine Tessier
 Madame Bovary (1937), directed by Gerhard Lamprecht and starring Pola Negri, Aribert Wäscher and Ferdinand Marian
 Madame Bovary (1949), directed by Vincente Minnelli and starring Jennifer Jones, James Mason, Van Heflin, Louis Jourdan and Gene Lockhart
 Madame Bovary (1964), a BBC TV series written by Giles Cooper
 Madame Bovary (1969), directed by Hans Schott-Schobinger and starring Edwige Fenech
 Madame Bovary (1975), a BBC TV series that used the same script as that of 1964
 Save and Protect (1989), directed by Alexandr Sokurov
 Madame Bovary (1991), directed by Claude Chabrol, and starring Isabelle Huppert in 1991. Jon Fortgang, writing for Film4, praised the film as "sumptuous period piece and pertinent tragic drama".
 Maya Memsaab (1993), a Hindi-language film, directed by Ketan Mehta and starring Deepa Sahi
 Madame Bovary (2014), directed by Sophie Barthes and starring Mia Wasikowska, Henry Lloyd-Hughes, Paul Giamatti, and Ezra Miller

David Lean's film Ryan's Daughter (1970) was a loose adaptation of the story, relocating it to Ireland during the time of the Easter Rebellion.  The script had begun life as a straight adaptation of Madame Bovary, but Lean convinced writer Robert Bolt to re-work it into another setting.

Other adaptations
 Emmanuel Bondeville's opera Madame Bovary was produced in 1951.
 Posy Simmonds' 1999 graphic novel Gemma Bovery (and Anne Fontaine's film adaptation) reworked the story into a satirical tale of English expatriates in France.
 A 2000 TV series adaptation by Heidi Thomas was made for the BBC, starring Frances O'Connor, Hugh Bonneville and Hugh Dancy.
 Abraham's Valley in 1993, directed by Manoel de Oliveira, is a close adaptation set in Portugal, in which Flaubert's novel is mentioned and discussed several times.
 The novel was loosely adapted in the Christian video series VeggieTales under the name Madame Blueberry.

See also

 Delphine Delamare
 The Perpetual Orgy
 I Am Not Madame Bovary (originally titled I Am Not Pan Jinlian)
 Arsenic poisoning

References

External links 

 
 Original text from Project Gutenberg
 
 Les manuscrits de Madame Bovary  – Site with images and transcriptions of Flaubert's original manuscripts, plus 4500 pages deleted/censored material
 Madame Bovary, 13-part Globe Radio adaptation, aired on NPR Playhouse in the late 1980s.
 Madame Bovary, audio version   
 Madame Bovary (original version) with 7500+ English annotations at Tailored Texts
 Madame Bovary, BBC Radio 4 discussion with Andy Martin, Mary Orr & Robert Gildea (In Our Time, 12 Jul. 2007)

1857 French novels
Novels by Gustave Flaubert
Realist novels
Adultery in novels
Novels set in 19th-century France
Novels first published in serial form
Works originally published in Revue de Paris
Novels set in Normandy
Michel Lévy Frères books
French novels adapted into films
Bovary, Madame
Censored books
French novels adapted into television shows
Novels adapted into operas
Literary characters introduced in 1856
1857 debut novels
Novels about suicide